The Director of the Bureau of the Census is the chief administrator of the United States Census Bureau (USCB). The officeholder is appointed by the president of the United States and confirmed by the United States Senate and assisted by the Deputy Director of the United States Census Bureau. The current director is Robert Santos.

History of the office
The nominal head of the early censuses was the Secretary of State, but management responsibility was actually devolved to the U.S. marshal in each state. These marshals collected and tabulated their own returns; the Secretary of State only oversaw the final compilation and tabulation of the data.

By 1840, the increasing standardization of census questionnaires and the enumeration process made it clear that more leadership at the federal level was necessary. Secretary of State John Forsyth appointed William Augustus Weaver as the first "superintending clerk of the census" in that year. Weaver and his successors oversaw the technical aspects of the census, including designing questionnaires, and more closely managed the tabulation process.

By 1870, the leader of the Census Office was the "superintendent of the census." The superintendent oversaw the entire census-taking process, and usually held the position from a year before the census until the final tabulations had been published.

After the Census Office became a permanent agency in 1902, the first director was the incumbent superintendent, William Rush Merriam. He set the standard for many directors of the U.S. Census Bureau over the next hundred years by focusing on external issues such as congressional testimony and leaving technical operations to the experts.

In 2012, the Presidential Appointment Efficiency and Streamlining Act of 2011 set the term for the Census Bureau director at five years; the director can serve for up to two terms. The Census director must also "have a demonstrated ability in managing large organizations and experience in the collection, analysis, and use of statistical data."

Chronology of Census Bureau leadership
The following is a chronological list of those who supervised the Census of the United States.

Secretaries of State
The Secretary of State was the nominal director of the first five censuses, responsible for supervision and compilation of each U.S. marshal's tabulation. In reality, these cabinet officers did very little actual directing. The authorizing legislation for most early censuses was very specific, and the marshals oversaw the actual enumeration process.

Superintending Clerks of the Census
Beginning in 1840 and continuing for the succeeding three censuses, operations and oversight were directed by a superintending clerk of the census.  Also, the Census Office shut down after it finished publishing the results of each census. Because of this, there were several periods in the nineteenth century in which there was no director.

Superintendents of the Census

Directors of the Census Bureau
The Census Bureau became a permanent agency in 1902.

References

United States Census Bureau